Magdalena Wolińska-Riedi (born 22 May 1979) is a Polish journalist and television presenter who also holds Vatican City citizenship through marriage. She started working as a travel presenter after graduating from the University of Warsaw before becoming the Telewizja Polska Italian correspondent.

Education 
Wolińska-Riedi has a degree in Italian studies from the University of Warsaw and a degree in church history from the Pontifical Gregorian University in Rome. She also studied at the Diplomatic Academy in Warsaw.

Career 
In 2014, Wolińska-Riedi replaced Urszula Rzepczak as the Italian correspondent for the Polish television network Telewizja Polska. She was invited to take up the role as the Telewizja Polska executives had seen her host a documentary about Polish people in the Vatican City. In 2016, Wolińska-Riedi was invited by the President of Poland Andrzej Duda to present a gift on behalf of Poland to Pope Francis as the only representative of Poland located in the Vatican City. This gesture was controversial and considered a breach of diplomatic protocol for Wolińska-Riedi to make the presentation as state gifts are supposed to be given by the head of state or high-ranking member of the government.

In addition to working as a journalist, Wolińska-Riedi also works as a Polish translator for Italian and Latin. Through these translation work, she has been associated with the Holy See's Sacred Roman Rota and the Supreme Tribunal of the Apostolic Signatura in a legal capacity.

Personal life 
Wolińska-Riedi is married to a member of the Pontifical Swiss Guard and was married by Cardinal Joseph Ratzinger, who later became Pope Benedict XVI. She has lived and worked in Vatican City since 2003. She holds Vatican City citizenship through her marriage to her husband, thus making her one of 30 women to hold Vatican citizenship in the world. She has two daughters, both of whom were baptized by Pope Benedict.

References

External links 

1979 births
Living people
Polish Roman Catholics
Polish journalists
Polish women journalists
Pontifical Gregorian University alumni
University of Warsaw alumni
Vatican City journalists
Women in Vatican City
Women television journalists